Tony Notte (born 15 April 1990) is an Australian rules footballer currently listed with the Swan Districts Football Club in the West Australian Football League (WAFL). He previously played two matches for the West Coast Eagles in the Australian Football League (AFL).

Career
Born in Perth, Western Australia, Notte played junior football for the Upper Swan Junior Football Club, and attended Governor Stirling Senior High School in Woodbridge. He represented Western Australia at the 2007 AFL Under 18 Championships, and was part of the Australian Institute of Sport's AFL Academy intake in 2007. Notte also played colts (under-18) matches for the Swan Districts Football Club in the WAFL. Notte was drafted by West Coast with the 20th pick overall in the 2007 National Draft, held in November 2007. He made his AFL debut in Round 20, 2008 against the Melbourne Football Club. Notte was de-listed at the end of the 2010 season.

References

External links
Tony Notte on the official website of the West Australian Football League
West Coast Eagles player profile

Tony Notte player profile page at WAFL FootyFacts

1990 births
Living people
People educated at Governor Stirling Senior High School
Australian rules footballers from Perth, Western Australia
Swan Districts Football Club players
West Coast Eagles players